Scott H. Irwin is the Laurence J. Norton Chair of Agricultural Marketing and professor in the department of agricultural and consumer economics at University of Illinois Urbana-Champaign.

Career 
Irwin earned a bachelor's degree in agricultural business from Iowa State University in 1980 and both an MS and PhD in agricultural economics from Purdue University in 1983 and 1986, respectively.  He currently teaches courses on commodity price analysis and futures and options market research.

Main contributions 
Irwin is a national and international leader in the field of agricultural economics.  His research on agricultural markets is widely cited by other academic researchers and is in high demand among market participants, policymakers, and the media. One of his papers was selected as the "Top 25 Paper Published in the First 25 Years of the Journal of Economic Surveys".

Irwin is best known for his work on the impact of speculation in commodity market.  He has been an active participant in the world-wide debate about the market impact of financial index investment in commodity markets, popularly known as financialization.  Irwin has published numerous academic articles on the subject and has been called upon to provide testimony before the US Congress, the Organisation for Economic Co-operation and Development, and the Commodity Futures Trading Commission, as well as publishing op-ed articles in the New York Times and the Washington Times. He has been invited to make presentations to numerous international organizations such as the World Trade Organization, Food and Agriculture Organization, World Bank, International Energy Agency, and International Institute of Finance.

Other contributions 
Irwin has developed agricultural extension programs that have helped farmers throughout the world make informed production, marketing, and financial decisions.

 His leadership and vision have been the driving force behind the farmdoc project at the University of Illinois since its inception in 1999.
 He led the development of farmdoc daily, which has the goal of publishing one original research-based article each day.

Controversy 
Scott H. Irwin was blamed, along with Craig Pirrong, by journalist David Kocieniewski for not disclosing ties with the financial industry. He has been paid for consulting services and research by private funding from financial companies. David Kocieniewski adds "Mr. Irwin declined to provide a list of his clients, and the university said its disclosure requirements did not compel him to do so". This report was hugely criticized by financial journalist Felix Salmon for being misleading and unethical. David Kocienewski answered to issues raised by Felix Salmon but the latter found Kocienewski's answers unconvincing.

Awards 
Irwin is a member of the Agricultural & Applied Economics Association (AAEA) and was named a Fellow in 2013. 
 2018, AAEA Bruce Gardner Memorial Prize for Applied Policy Analysis
 2018, APEX Distinguished Alumni Award, Department of Agricultural Economics, Purdue University
 2016, AAEA Quality of Research Discovery Award
 2016, AAEA Distinguished Group Extension Program Award
 2016, Spitze Land-Grant Professorial Career Excellence Award, College of Agricultural, Consumer, and Environmental Science, University of Illinois Urbana-Champaign
 2014, AAEA Quality of Communication Award
 2014, AAEA Distinguished Group Extension Program Award
 2013, AAEA Fellow
 2008, Donald A. Holt Achievement Award, Illinois Council on Food and Agricultural Research
 2004, 2010, 2013 Team Award, College of Agricultural, Consumer, and Environmental Science, University of Illinois Urbana-Champaign
 2002, AAEA Distinguished Group Extension Program Award

References

External links 
 Scott H. Irwin at farmdoc
 Scott H. Irwin at University of Illinois
 
 

1957 births
Living people
University of Illinois faculty
21st-century American economists
Macroeconomists
Purdue University College of Agriculture alumni
University of Illinois Urbana-Champaign faculty
Fellows of the Econometric Society
American textbook writers
Iowa State University alumni